Pablo Martín Lima Olid (born March 26th 1981 in Montevideo) is a retired Uruguayan football left-back.

Club career

Danubio
Lima made his professional debut in 2001 for Danubio FC. He was an integral part of the Danubio squad that won two league championships in 2004 and 2006–07.

Argentina
In 2007, he moved to Vélez Sársfield of the Primera División Argentina, at request of then manager Ricardo La Volpe. Lima holds the record of the fastest red card in the history of short tournaments in Argentina (which started in 1991). He was sent off at 2'45'' of Vélez' first game of the Apertura 07, after a violent foul over Colón's Pablo Jerez. He joined Rosario Central on 12 January 2009, on loan from Vélez Sársfield and helped the team avoid relegation by playing all but one game of the tournament and scoring two goals from free kicks.

Lima's contract with Vélez Sársfield was set to end in June 2010 and the club stated publicly it would not be renewed.

Iraklis
On August 2, 2010 Iraklis announced the signing of a two-year contract with Pablo Lima. He debuted for the club in the opening day of the 2010-2011 Superleague season in a 2-1 home win against Greek giants Olympiacos. In matchday 2, he contributed to his team's away draw against Atromitos by making the cross that assisted his teammate Karim Soltani to score a late equaliser. In the next match, a 1-0 home win against AEL, he hit the free kick that forced Daniel Cousin to score an own-goal, in his attempt to clear the ball. After a home defeat, against Kavala in matchday 4, he lost his place in the first team. He reappeared in matchday 13 against Panionios as a substitute in the 77th minute. In the next match of Iraklis, Lima scored his first goal for the club, on a home 1-1 draw against Ergotelis. It was a free-kick hit from way outside the area. That goal was declared as the Best Goal of the 13th matchday of the Greek Superleague. The prize was handed to him by former Iraklis player Kyriakos Fytilis. After that match Pablo Lima re-established his place at the starting eleven of the club.

Return to Argentina
After a stint with the Greek club during the 2010-11 season, he returned to Argentina to join Colón de Santa Fe in July 2011.

On 6 August 2012, Lima signed a one-year loan deal with Quilmes Atlético Club.

International career
Since his debut at the 2001 Copa América Lima played 14 games with the Uruguay national team until his last one so far in 2007. He scored his only goal against Costa Rica during the 2001 Copa América.

Honours
Danubio
Primera División Uruguaya (2): 2004, 2006–07

References

External links
 Argentine Primera statistics at Fútbol XXI
 Football-Lineups player profile
 
 Pablo Lima's profile in Iraklis' FC Official site
 Pablo Lima's profile in Iraklis' FC Official site

1981 births
Living people
Footballers from Montevideo
Uruguayan footballers
Association football defenders
Uruguay international footballers
Uruguayan expatriate footballers
Argentine Primera División players
Super League Greece players
Danubio F.C. players
Club Atlético Vélez Sarsfield footballers
Rosario Central footballers
Iraklis Thessaloniki F.C. players
Club Atlético Colón footballers
Quilmes Atlético Club footballers
Peñarol players
Expatriate footballers in Argentina
Expatriate footballers in Greece